Duncan Phillips may refer to:

 Duncan Phillips (musician), drummer with the  Christian pop rock band Newsboys
 Duncan Phillips (art collector) (1886–1966), American art collector and critic